Hriňová is a town in the Detva District of central Slovakia.

Etymology
The name is derived from a dialect word for horseradish.  - a horseradish, dialect: hriň (noun), hriňová (fem. adjective).

Geography
The town is located on the Slatina river, under the Poľana mountains. A dam is located above the town.

History
At first, the town was a part of Detva municipality, which arose in the 17th century. In 1891, Hriňová became a separate municipality from Detva. It has town status since 1 January 1989.

Demographics
According to the 2001 census, the town had 8,289 inhabitants. 98.56% of inhabitants were Slovaks, 0.42% Czechs and 0.35% Roma. The religious make-up was 88.85% Roman Catholics, 6.19% people with no religious affiliation and 2.10% Lutherans.

See also
 List of municipalities and towns in Slovakia

References

Genealogical resources

The records for genealogical research are available at the state archive "Statny Archiv in Banska Bystrica, Slovakia"

 Roman Catholic church records (births/marriages/deaths): 1763-1934 (parish B)

External links
 Municipal website
Surnames of living people in Hrinova

Cities and towns in Slovakia